Ping Identity Corporation is an American software company established in 2002 by Andre Durand and Bryan Field-Elliot. It is headquartered in Denver, Colorado, United States with development offices in Vancouver, British Columbia, Tel Aviv, Israel, Austin, Texas, Denver, Colorado, Boston, Massachusetts and Edinburgh, Scotland.  Ping also has European operations with offices in London, Paris, and Switzerland as well as offices in Bangalore,  Melbourne, and Tokyo, serving Asia-pacific. It was a publicly traded company until getting acquired by Thoma Bravo and taken private in October 2022.

The company's software provides federated identity management and self-hosted identity access management to web identities via attribute based access controls, similar to identity management system tools developed by Microsoft and Okta. The Single Sign-On (SSO) option gives users a single set of credentials to access applications (web applications, apps on mobile devices, VPN, etc) that have company data. This is primarily done with identity providers such as Ping, Okta, and Microsoft Azure by leveraging open standards such as SAML and OAuth.

Ping Identity products include PingID, PingFederate, PingOne, PingAccess, PingDirectory, PingAuthorize, and PingIntelligence. Along with Okta, Microsoft, Salesforce, and Google, these comprise the "identity meta system" as defined in "Design Rationale behind the Identity Metasystem Architecture".

History
Ping Identity Corporation is a software company established in 2002 by Andre Durand and Bryan Field-Elliot, in Denver, Colorado. Ping Identity provides federated identity management and self-hosted identity access management (IAM) solutions to web identities and single sign-on solutions, being one of a number of organizations competing to provide standards to replace passwords for authenticating to web applications.

Ping Identity has received a number of rounds of funding, beginning with a Series A on April 16, 2004. Since then, it has received $35 million from Kohlberg Kravis Roberts on September 18, 2014, $44 million from DFJ Growth and W Capital Partners on July 16, 2013, as well as $21 million from Silicon Valley Bank, Triangle Peak Partners on June 21, 2011, and $13 million from Appian Ventures.

Vista Equity Partners, a private equity firm based in Austin, Texas, acquired majority ownership of Ping Identity in a leveraged buyout for $600 million on June 1, 2016. At the time of the sale, Ping Identity had already taken $125 million in funding.

In September 2019, Vista Equity Partners took the company public rather than selling it. Goldman Sachs led Ping Identity's initial public offering (IPO).

Ping Identity Holding Corp was initially listed on the New York Stock Exchange with 12,500,000 shares of common stock at $15.00 per share. The value of the stock rose $5 in its first day and jumped to a 30% increase in the market debut. This was the first organization that Vista Holdings took public. Vista retained 80 percent ownership of the company.

In August 2022, Thoma Bravo agreed to buy Ping Identity for $2.8 billion in an all-cash transaction. The acquisition was completed in October 2022.

References

External links 
 

Companies based in Denver
Software companies based in Colorado
American companies established in 2002
Software companies established in 2002
2002 establishments in Colorado
Cloud applications
Identity management systems
Companies formerly listed on the New York Stock Exchange
2019 initial public offerings
Software companies of the United States
2022 mergers and acquisitions
Private equity portfolio companies